Pedro Serrano may refer to:

Pedro Serrano (sailor), supposedly marooned in the Americas during the 16th century
Pedro Serrano (police officer), fought against a quota system in the New York City Police Department
Pedro Serrano (weightlifter) (born 1931), Puerto Rican Olympic weightlifter
Pedro Julio Serrano (born 1974), human rights activist